The women's triple jump at the 2017 World Championships in Athletics was held at the Olympic Stadium on 5 and 7 August.

Summary
The final started off with Shanieka Ricketts jumping 14.13 metres, which turned out to be her best. The second jumper Kristin Gierisch improved 3 centimeters to 14.16 metres then the fifth jumper, Olympic bronze medalist Olga Rypakova took the lead out to 14.45 metres. That lasted four more jumps until the young Venezuelan Olympic silver medalist Yulimar Rojas added 10 more centimeters to 14.55 metres which only lasted until the next athlete down the runway, gold medalist Colombian veteran Caterine Ibargüen added another dozen to 14.67 metres. The second round saw Rojas improve up to 14.82 metres, while Ibargüen only improved to 10.69 metres. The third round saw Rypakova jump past Ibargüen to 14.77 metres. Rojas improved a centimetre, then Ibargüen leaped past both of them back into the lead with a 14.89 metres. In the fifth round, Rojas edged ahead again with a 14.91 metres, but Ibargüen had two more attempts left. Her 14.88 metres final attempt didn't quite get there.

It was the same medalists as the Olympics, but a South American changing of the guard at the top. Rojas' was the first gold medal in the World Championships for Venezuela, only a day after Robeilys Peinado got their first medal ever.

Records
Before the competition records were as follows:

No records were set at the competition.

Qualification standard
The standard to qualify automatically for entry was 14.10 metres.

Schedule
The event schedule, in local time (UTC+1), was as follows:

Results

Qualification
The qualification round took place on 5 August, in two groups, with Group A starting at 11:01 and Group B starting at 11:00. Athletes attaining a mark of at least 14.20 metres ( Q ) or at least the 12 best performers ( q ) qualified for the final. The overall results were as follows:

Final
The final took place on 7 August at 20:25. The results were as follows:

References

Triple jump
Triple jump at the World Athletics Championships